The following is a comprehensive discography of the Canadian heavy metal band Voivod.

Albums

Studio albums

Live albums
Voivod Lives (2000)
Warriors of Ice (2011)
Live at Roadburn (2011)
Lost Machine – Live (2020)

Compilation albums
The Best of Voivod (1992)
Kronik (1998)
To the Death 84 (2011)
Build Your Weapons: The Very Best of the Noise Years 1986-1988 (2017)

EPs
Thrashing Rage (1986)
Cockroaches (1987)
Angel Rat Sampler (1991)
Live @ Musiqueplus (2000)
Post Society (2016)
The End of Dormancy (2020)

Demos
Anachronism (1983)
To the Death (1984)
Morgoth Invasion (1984)
Zeche Bochum (1986)
No Speed Limit Weekend (1986)
Live à Bruxelles (1987)
Dimension Hatröss Demos (1987)
Spectrum (1987)
Nothingface Demos (1988)
A Flawless Structure? (1988)
Live at the Paradise (1990)
Angel Rat Demos (1991)
Negatron Demos (1994)
Klubben Stockholm (1999)
2001 Album Demo (2001)
Katorz Demos (2004)
Alveol, an Angel Rat Demo (2022)

DVDs
D-V-O-D-1 (2005)
Tatsumaki: Voivod in Japan (2008)

Music videos

Voivod (1984)
Ripping Headaches (1986)
Ravenous Medicine (1987)
Tribal Convictions (1988)
Psychic Vacuum (1988)
Astronomy Domine (1989)
Clouds in My House (1991)
Insect (1995)
The Tower (1997)
We Carry On (2003)
Mechanical Mind (2013)
Target Earth (2013)
Kluskap O'Kom (2013)
We Are Connected (2015)
Post Society (2016)
Obsolete Beings (2018)
Always Moving (2018)
Iconspiracy (2018)
The End Of Dormancy (Metal Section) (2020)
Planet Eaters (2021)
Synchro Anarchy (2022)
Sleeves Off (2022)
Quest For Nothing (2022)

Heavy metal group discographies
Discographies of Canadian artists